James Laney may refer to:
 James T. Laney (born 1927), educator and ambassador
 Pete Laney (James Earl Laney, born 1943), politician